The 1966-67 French Rugby Union Championship was contested by 56 teams divided in 7 pools. The four first teams of each pool and the better four classified 5th were qualified for the "last 32".

The US Montauban won the Championship after beating Bègles in the final, for his only victory at the moment in its story.

Context 
The "équipe de France" won the 1967 Five Nations Championship with 3 victorys and only a lost match against Scotland.

The Challenge Yves du Manoir was won en 1967 by  Lourdes that beat Narbonne 9 - 3.

 Qualification round 

In bold the qualified to next round

 "Last 32" 

In bold the clubs qualified for the next round

 "Last 16" 

In bold the clubs qualified for the next round

The title-holder, Agen, was eliminated from "The Last 16" by Bègles.

 Quarter of finals 

In bold' the clubs qualified for the next round

Semifinals

Final

External links 

  Compte rendu finale de 1967 lnr.fr
  Finale 1967 finalesrugby.com

1967
France 1967
Championship